Zu Mantua in Banden (also known as the Andreas-Hofer-Lied) is one of the most popular folk songs and, since 1948, the official anthem of the current Austrian State of Tyrol, i.e. the Northern and Eastern part of the former County of Tyrol. The Landtag assembly of the Italian South Tyrol province on 29 October 2004 by majority has rejected its adoption with regard to the Italian-speaking minority. It is however, like the Bozner Bergsteigerlied, an unofficial anthem of the German-speaking community.

The lyrics were written by the German writer Julius Mosen in 1831, the German composer Leopold Knebelsberger melodized them in 1844. The song deals with the death of Andreas Hofer, an innkeeper by trade, who was the leader of the Tyrolean Rebellion against the French and Bavarian occupation during the War of the Fifth Coalition in 1809. After Emperor Francis I of Austria had signed the Treaty of Schönbrunn, Hofer fought a losing battle. Betrayed and captured, he was executed by personal command of Napoleon at Mantua in Italy on 20 February 1810 by the French forces.

The song originating from the Vormärz era became popular in the course of the veneration of Andreas Hofer as a protagonist of the Pan-German movement in the Austrian lands, especially aimed against Italian irredentism. Therefore, it has become subject to increasing criticism in recent years. Nevertheless, having official status as a regional anthem since 1948, it is, forbidden by law since 1972 with a fine of up to 2000 € possibly imposed, to sing parody versions of the song or to alter the lyrics otherwise in a way that might be insulting to the Tyrolean population. Originally, it was generally forbidden to sing different lyrics to the anthem's melody. However, a popular socialist song, is written to the melody of the Tyrolean anthem. Dem Morgenrot entgegen was sung at an event hosted by the SPÖ in 2004, which resulted in a legal complaint by the Tyrolean governor. The current legal situation was then established after an objection by the SPÖ at the Austrian Constitutional Court, which said court has affirmed.

Lyrics
The English lyrics are roughly translated.

References

Tyrolean culture
Austrian songs
Austrian patriotic songs
Austrian military marches
German patriotic songs